Campbell General Hospital was a Union Civil War hospital which operated from September 1862 to July 20, 1865, in northwest Washington, D.C.

Location
The hospital was located on Boundary Street NW (now Florida Avenue NW) between 5th Street NW and 6th Street NW.

History

The hospital was opened in September 1862 but did not receive most of its patients until in December 1862.

The hospital was built with 900 beds. In the Census of the General Hospitals, Department of Washington of December 17, 1864, only 633 beds were occupied.

It was very similar to the other hospitals, though it differed by having a theater offering nightly entertainment to patients. This feature led to the Hospital almost becoming the scene of the Lincoln assassination. John Wilkes Booth was informed that President Lincoln would be attending a performance of Still Waters Run Deep on March 17, 1865. He arranged for an ambush in a rush. Upon arriving at the location, a carriage approached, but it was not Abraham Lincoln on board. It could have been Salmon P. Chase, Chief Justice of the United States who attended the show. President Lincoln's schedule had been changed and he was meeting with a group of Indiana soldiers instead. The assassination plot was postponed and took place on April 14, 1865, at Ford's Theatre instead.

Freedman's Hospital
In 1862, Camp Barker was established by the War Department at 12th Street NW and R Street NW. It was renamed to the Freedmen's Hospital in 1863. It moved to the Campbell General Hospital in January 1865 when the one story building was razed and later that year, it was placed under the Freedmen's Bureau. Freedman General Hospital had 72 beds which were full in 1864.
The hospital was reported empty in July 1865.

See also

 Washington, D.C., in the American Civil War
 Medicine in the American Civil War
 Armory Square Hospital
 Lincoln Hospital
 Mount Pleasant General Hospital
 Harewood General Hospital
 Finley General Hospital
 Lincoln assassination
 Abraham Lincoln

References

Campbell General Hospital
Military facilities in Washington, D.C.
Demolished buildings and structures in Washington, D.C.
Washington, D.C., in the American Civil War
1862 establishments in Washington, D.C.
1865 disestablishments in Washington, D.C.
Defunct hospitals in Washington, D.C.